Lavilla Esther Allen ( Ostrander; May 28, 1834 – November 11, 1903), also known as Esther Lavilla Allen, was an American author, poet, and reader.

Biography
Lavilla Esther Ostrander was born in Ithaca, New York, May 28, 1834. While she was a child, her parents removed to Ypsilanti, Michigan, where her youth was passed. She was educated in the seminary of that town. She wrote verses in her youth.

In 1851, she married William Schuyler Allen and lived in Hillsdale, Michigan. She began her literary career in earnest in 1870, writing stories, sketches and poems for publication, which were widely copied. She contributed to the Ladies' Repository, the Masonic Magazine, the Chicago Interior, the Advance, the Northwestern Christian Advocate, and other prominent periodicals. Much of her work was devoted to temperance and missionary lines, but she also wrote countless poems for various occasions. Besides her work as a writer, she was a fine reader, often reading her poetical productions in public, mainly before college societies.

She experienced a high degree of success with her first book of poems before writing volumes of missionary and temperance literature, and hundreds of verses upon various subjects at the request of friends. Her works were characterized by high ideals of life, by sincere and noble pursuits, and a pervading purity. She was also interested in missionary, Sunday school, and educational work, as well as charitable and reformatory enterprises.

Lavilla Allen died November 11, 1903, and is buried at Oak Grove Cemetery in Hillsdale, Michigan.

Selected works
 Aunt Betsy's Pumpkin Pie and other poems, 1878.

References

Bibliography

External links
 

1834 births
1903 deaths
19th-century American writers
19th-century American women writers
Writers from Ithaca, New York
American religious writers
Women religious writers
American women non-fiction writers
Wikipedia articles incorporating text from A Woman of the Century